Lecanora rupicola is a species of crustose lichen in the family Lecanoraceae. It is a known host species to the lichenicolous fungus Arthonia glaucomaria.

See also
List of Lecanora species

References

rupicola
Lichen species
Lichens described in 1767
Lichens of North America
Taxa named by Carl Linnaeus